A by-election was held for the Australian House of Representatives seat of McPherson on 21 February 1981. This was triggered by the sudden death of Liberal Party MP Eric Robinson. It was held on the same day as by-elections for Boothby and Curtin.

Although National Country Party Senator Glen Sheil resigned from the Senate to contest the by-election, it was won by Liberal candidate Peter White, a former member of the Legislative Assembly of Queensland who had retired in preparation for the by-election.

Key dates

Results

References

1981 elections in Australia
Queensland federal by-elections
1980s in Queensland